The Lincoln Theater is a historic theater in South Los Angeles, California.  The Moorish Revival building was listed on the National Register of Historic Places in 2009.  Sometimes referred to as the "West Coast Apollo", the Lincoln Theater was one of the most significant establishments along the Central Avenue Corridor that became the cultural and business hub of the African American community in Los Angeles from the 1920s to the 1950s.  For more than 30 years, the Lincoln featured live theater, musical acts, talent shows, vaudeville, and motion pictures, including live performances by the leading African-American performers of the era, including Lionel Hampton, Duke Ellington, the Nat King Cole Trio, and Billie Holiday. The Lincoln Theater was managed and directed by Jules Wolf  The theater was converted to use as a church in 1962 and continues to be used for religious services.

Design and construction
The Lincoln Theater was built between 1926 and 1927 at a cost of $500,000.  The theater was built in the style of a grand movie palace with a large stage, orchestra pit, and seating for 2,100 persons.  The building was designed by architect John Paxton Perrine (1886–1972), who is known for his design of Southern California movie palaces in the 1920s, including  the California Theater (1926, San Diego), the Roosevelt Theater (1926, Hawthorne), the Fox Redondo Theater (1927, Redondo Beach), and the California Theatre (1928, San Bernardino). The Lincoln was considered by the California Eagle, "the finest and most beautiful theater in the country built exclusively for race patronage."

The Lincoln Theater is considered an outstanding example of Exotic Revival and Moorish Revival architecture.  The front facade is divided into three symmetrical bays with the theater's entrance at the bottom of the central bay.  The facade is marked by decorative ceramic tile above arches in the side bays and columns that are capped by onion-shaped capitals and lance-shaped spires.  The area in the central bay above the marquee is decorated with layers of arches and columns that were intended to create "the overall impression of a step-back tower in low relief".

The Central Avenue Corridor
In the 1910s and 1920s, large movie theaters were opened in Downtown Los Angeles in the Broadway Theater District.  However, African Americans were either excluded from these theaters altogether or restricted to "colored only" seating areas.  During the 1910s and 1920s, a number of cultural and business institutions catering to the African-American population of Los Angeles opened along a one-mile stretch of South Central Avenue.  These included Dreamland Rink, the Murray Pocket Billiard Emporium and Cigar Stand, the 28th Street YMCA, Second Baptist Church, Sidney P. Dones Company (offering real estate, insurance and legal services), the California Eagle newspaper, the Dunbar Hotel, and the Lincoln Theater. The area, known as the Central Avenue Corridor, became the cultural and economic hub of the African-American community in Los Angeles from the 1920s through the 1950s.

The Lincoln was the largest of several theaters along the Central Avenue Corridor offering entertainment to the African-American community.  Three of the others (the Tivoli, Angelus and Hub Theaters) have since been demolished.  A fourth, the Globe Theater, has been substantially altered.

Early years
The Lincoln Theater opened in October 1927. The "Chocolate Scandals" and Curtis Mosby's Dixieland Blue Blowers provided the entertainment at an invitation-only premiere on October 6, 1927.  Though catering to the African-American community, the Lincoln became popular with the city's white audiences as well.  In May 1928, Los Angeles Times columnist Lee Shippey wrote of the Lincoln:

It is a big, well-appointed theater in which all of the actors and almost all of the auditors are negroes.  But many white people crowd in, too, because the chance to see negro actors of real ability appearing for their own people rather than appearing as negroes from the white man's point of view is one that doesn't come to one in every city.

The Lincoln Theater's house company, known as the Lafayette Players, attracted Hollywood celebrities, including Charlie Chaplin, Irving Thalberg, Janet Gaynor, and Fanny Brice, to performances at the Lincoln.  Notable performers who appeared at the Lincoln in the late 1920s include Nina Mae McKinney (known as "The Black Garbo"), Evelyn Preer (known in the African-American community as "The First Lady of the Screen"), Clarence Muse, Elsie Ferguson, Laura Bowman, Abbie Mitchell, Charles Sidney Gilpin, and the house band, Mosby's Blue Syncopators providing "'hot' music while a chorus of twenty-four dusky beauties ... strut to its tunes."

The "West Coast Apollo"
From the 1930s to the 1950s, the Lincoln featured live theater, concerts, talent shows, vaudeville, and film.  One historical account noted that the Lincoln "offered stunning stage shows and packed in black audiences on Saturday and Sunday nights."  The Lincoln was the site of performances by many of the leading African-American performers of the era, including Lionel Hampton, Duke Ellington, the Nat King Cole Trio, Billie Holiday, Lena Horne, Louis Jordan, Pigmeat Markham, Fats Domino, and B.B. King.  The Lincoln was sometimes called the "West Coast Apollo" because it featured many of the same acts as Harlem's Apollo Theater.

Concerts at the Lincoln in the post-World War II era attracted diverse audiences that included the likes of choreographer Alvin Ailey, activist Eldridge Cleaver, and songwriter eden ahbez.  It was outside the Lincoln in the late 1940s that a bearded ahbez wearing sandals handed the song "Nature Boy" to Nat King Cole's road manager.

Conversion to church use
In 1962, the Lincoln Theater was sold to the Southern California First Jurisdiction of the Church of God in Christ and became known as "The Crouch Temple" operated by Bishop Samuel M. Crouch.  The theater was later operated as the Iglesia de Cristo Ministries Juda.

In 2009, the theater was deemed to satisfy the registration requirements set forth in a multiple property submission study, the African Americans in Los Angeles MPS.  Other sites listed on the National Register of Historic Places in 2009 pursuant to the same African Americans in Los Angeles MPS include the Second Baptist Church, 28th Street YMCA, Prince Hall Masonic Temple, Angelus Funeral Home, 52nd Place Historic District, 27th Street Historic District, and two historic all-black segregated fire stations (Fire Station No. 14 and Fire Station No. 30).

See also
National Register of Historic Places listings in Los Angeles, California
List of Los Angeles Historic-Cultural Monuments in South Los Angeles

References

Theatres completed in 1927
Theatres on the National Register of Historic Places in Los Angeles
Event venues established in 1927
South Los Angeles